is a Japanese footballer currently playing as a midfielder for Tegevajaro Miyazaki, on loan from Montedio Yamagata.

Career statistics

Club
.

Notes

References

External links

1998 births
Living people
Toin University of Yokohama alumni
Japanese footballers
Association football midfielders
J2 League players
J3 League players
Tokyo Verdy players
Montedio Yamagata players
Tegevajaro Miyazaki players